A penetrometer is a device to test the strength of a material.

Soil
There are many types of penetrometer designed to be used on soil. They are usually round or cone shaped. The penetrometer is dropped on the test subject or pressed against it and the depth of the resulting hole is measured. The measurements find whether the soil is strong enough to build a road on. Scientists also use a penetrometer to measure how much moisture is in soil. Penetrometers are used by space probes such as the Cassini–Huygens probe, to measure the amount of moisture in soil on other planets. Penetrometers are furthermore used in glaciology to measure the strength and nature of materials underlying a glacier at its bed.

A penetrometer is also used in longer professional cricket matches, to measure how the pitch is holding up over the course of a multi-day match.

British horse racing courses have been required, since 2009, to report the readings obtained using a penetrometer designed by Cranfield University and TurfTrax, known as the GoingStick, on each day of a race meeting.

Botany
A penetrometer may be used in botany to find the toughness of a leaf by measuring the force needed to punch a hole of a certain size through the leaf.

Penetrometers are also used to measure the firmness of apples and other hard fruit.

Science

Penetrometers equipped with a known needle and mass are used to determine the hardness of bitumen and thus its efficacy and material properties when applied to roads as asphalt concrete.

Food Products

Penetrometers are used for objective evaluation of food products. Penetrometers, equipped with a plunger and a needle or cone, penetrate food samples through gravitational force for a selected period of time. The distance the test device penetrates into the sample is measured to determine the relative tenderness of the samples such as baked products and gels.

External links
University of Arizona document, "An impact penetrometer for a landing spacecraft." 
Picture of a penetrometer from the European Space Agency (ESA)
Proceedings of the Entomological Society of Washington, "A portable penetrometer for measuring leaf toughness in insect herbivory studies."

References 

Measuring instruments